Charilaos Vasilakos (November 1875 – December 1, 1964) was a Greek athlete and the first man to win a marathon race. He also won a silver medal at the 1896 Summer Olympics in Athens.

Biography

Vasilakos was born in Piraeus, Greece. His father Michael Vasilakos was from the Mani region and served in the army. He was the oldest of three siblings and at age fourteen his father died. As a young man he studied law at the University of Athens and worked in the Athens court of first instance. He was a member of the Panellinios sports club and a dedicated athlete who pursued running.

On March 22, 1896, Greece held the first modern Panhellenic Games. The main purpose of the games was to select the team that would compete in the first Modern Olympic Games later the same year. All participants were members of Greek sports clubs. Vasilakos had a reputation as a strong long-distance runner. He won the marathon race with a time of 3 hours and 18 minutes.

Vasilakos was one of seventeen athletes to start the Olympic race on April 10, 1896.  He finished in second place, behind Spiridon Louis, with a time of 3:06.03 as one of only nine finishers. Both races were on 40 kilometre courses rather than the now-standard 42.195 kilometres.

After the Olympics, Vasilakos helped establish, and participated in, racewalking in Greece. In 1900 he won the first Greek 1000 metres walking race and participated in several races between 1900 and 1906.

Vasilakos studied law and went on to become a customs director in the Greek Ministry of Finance. He had a reputation for honesty and integrity. In 1960 he was awarded the Gold Cross of the Order of Phoenix by King Paul of Greece. Annual marathon races in Olympia commemorate Vasilakos. He was married to wife Helen. He died in Athens in 1964.

The 2011 book titled Ο Χαρίλαος Βασιλάκος και η αμφιλεγόμενη πρωτιά του Σπύρου Λούη, which translates from Greek to Charilaos Vasilakos and the controversial lead of Spyros Louis, presents a biography of Vasilakos and signs which challenge the 1896 Olympic race results.

References

External links

 , translated from the original in Greek at sansimera.gr
 , translated from 

1875 births
1964 deaths
Athletes (track and field) at the 1896 Summer Olympics
19th-century sportsmen
Gold Crosses of the Order of the Phoenix (Greece)
Greek male marathon runners
Medalists at the 1896 Summer Olympics
Olympic athletes of Greece
Olympic silver medalists for Greece
Olympic silver medalists in athletics (track and field)
Athletes from Piraeus